Ratwara a village in Sitamarhi district of Bihar, India also known as Vishnupur Ratwara or Bishunpur Ratwara.

About
The village comes under Bajpatti block. Ratwara is about 14 km east of Sitamarhi district headquarters (Dumra) and about 10 km west of Janakpur Road aka Pupri. Ratwara is well connected by road to Sitamarhi and Pupri. The nearest railway station is Bajpatti (about 6 km) and the nearest airport is Darbhanga (about 60 km). The postal code is 843333. People from this village are spread across different parts of India like Bangalore, Mumbai, Delhi, etc.

Education
The village has four middle schools including one Urdu Vidayalaya and education is available up to 8th standard.

Local festivals

Major festivals celebrated in Ratwara - 
Holi, 
Durga Puja, 
Diwali, 
Chhath.

Fruits

Maldah or Langda Mango, 
Litchi.

References

Villages in Sitamarhi district